Longtanping Town is an urban town in Sangzhi County, Zhangjiajie, Hunan Province, China.

Administrative division
The town is divided into 10 villages and 1 community, the following areas: Longtanping Community, Liujiajie Village, Zhuya Village, Yinfeng Village, Qiaotou Village, Baizhuping Village, Ganping Village, Lijiawan Village, Sanhejie Village, Maoya Village, and Yuntoushan Village (龙潭坪社区、刘家界村、竹亚村、银风村、桥头村、白竹坪村、赶坪村、李家湾村、三合街村、毛亚村、云头山村).

References

External links

Divisions of Sangzhi County